Preston-on-Tees, locally called Preston, is a village and civil parish in the borough of Stockton-on-Tees, County Durham, England. The civil parish population at the 2011 census was 1,689. It is home to Preston Hall and it's accompanying public park.

In the 2011, the village was included as a part of Yarm, being on Yarm Road and in a continuous built-up area down to Yarm High Street.

Governance
The parish originated as a township in the Stockton-on-Tees parish, recognised as a civil parish itself in 1866. It was included in the Stockton poor law union and then the Stockton rural sanitary district. In 1894 this became the Stockton Rural District. In 1968 part of it became part of the county borough of Teesside. It later became part of the non-metropolitan district of Stockton-on-Tees in 1974 under the Local Government Act 1972.

Demography
According to the 2001 census, it had a population of 1,748. It has a diverse number of property types, ranging from terraced rented houses to large detached private dwellings.

Education 
Preston-on-Tees has one school, Eaglescliffe Junction School was built in 1907, and later became known as Preston Primary School. The parish is in the catchment for Egglescliffe Secondary School.

Religious sites
There is a Methodist church on Witham Avenue. The church is named Eaglescliffe Trinity Methodist Church and was opened in 1902. There is also a Church of England parish church dedicated to All Saints, which was founded in the early 1900s as a church plant into Preston-on-Tees from the Church of St Thomas, Stockton.

References

Places in the Tees Valley
Civil parishes in County Durham
Borough of Stockton-on-Tees